Rzhava is a rural locality in Baninsky Selsoviet Rural Settlement, Fatezhsky District, Kursk Oblast, Russia. The population as of 2010 is 400.

Geography 
The village is located on the Rzhavets River (a tributary of the Krasavka in the Svapa River basin), 105 km from the Russia–Ukraine border, 51 km north-west of Kursk, 6 km north of the district center – the town Fatezh, 2 km from the selsoviet center – Chermoshnoy.

Climate
Rzhava has a warm-summer humid continental climate (Dfb in the Köppen climate classification).

Transport 
Rzhava is located 1 km from the federal route  Crimea Highway as part of the European route E105, 6 km from the road of regional importance  (Fatezh – Dmitriyev), 1 km from the road of intermunicipal significance  (M2 "Crimea Highway" – 1st Banino), on the road  (38N-233 – Rzhava), 28 km from the nearest railway station Vozy (railway line Oryol – Kursk).

The rural locality is situated 52 km from Kursk Vostochny Airport, 174 km from Belgorod International Airport and 234 km from Voronezh Peter the Great Airport.

References

Notes

Sources

Rural localities in Fatezhsky District